Ambrosius Imanuel Høyer (9 August 1886 – 9 May 1919) was a Norwegian rower. He competed in the men's eight event at the 1908 Summer Olympics.

References

External links
 
 

1886 births
1919 deaths
Norwegian male rowers
Olympic rowers of Norway
Rowers at the 1908 Summer Olympics
Rowers from Oslo